"The Deepest Sighs, the Frankest Shadows" is a song by Australian alternative rock band Gang of Youths, released in August 2017 as the fourth and final single from their second studio album Go Farther in Lightness (2017). The song peaked at number 93 on the ARIA Singles Chart, becoming the band's second top 100 single.

In the Triple J Hottest 100 of 2017, the song polled at number five. In 2020's Hottest 100 of the Decade, it appeared at number 52. At the APRA Music Awards of 2019, the song was nominated for Rock Work of the Year. As of August 2020, the song is verified platinum for selling over 70,000 units.

Writing 
Frontman David Le'aupepe said the song came about after struggling with a severe case of writer's block and questioning his place in the world. In discussing his motivation for the song's message, he said:"In a cosmos potentially absent of meaning, and an existence devoid of objective value, I have an opportunity to invent my own meaning. We all do."

Music video
The music video was filmed in Little River, Victoria and directed by Dan & Jared Daperis of LateNite Films. The video was released on 8 August 2017 and shows Le'aupepe as a convict escaping in the early morning, as the sun rises through fields. The music video was nominated for Best Video at the ARIA Music Awards of 2017.

Charts

Certifications

References

2017 singles
2016 songs
Gang of Youths songs